General Orbeliani may refer to:

Georgy Orbeliani (1853–1924), Imperial Russian Army lieutenant general
Grigol Orbeliani (1804–1883), Imperial Russian Army general of the infantry
Ivan Makarovich Orbeliani (1844–1919), Imperial Russian Army general of the cavalry
Vakhtang Orbeliani (1812–1890), Imperial Russian Army major general